Fernand Cazenave (26 November 1924, in Orthez – 11 January 2005, in Mont-de-Marsan) was a former French rugby union international and national coach.

Cazenave played six times for France as a winger in the 1950s. He made his debut against England in 1950 and scored his only Test try as France won 6-3.
His last match, was also against England, in 1954 which France again won 11-3, in Paris.

He took up coaching and coached Mont-de-Marsan to victory in the French Championship in 1963, the only time the club has won the championship. Mont-de-Marsan also won the Yves Du-Manoir three times, 1961-62.

He took over as French coach from Jean Prat in 1968. During this time, France toured South Africa (1971) and Australia (1972). He was coach until 1973 when Jean Desclaux took over. Cazenave became the French Federation's first national technical director.

He died aged 80 on 11 January 2005.

External links
France mourn Fernand Cazenave

1924 births
2005 deaths
Sportspeople from Pyrénées-Atlantiques
French rugby union players
French rugby union coaches
France international rugby union players
France national rugby union team coaches
People from Orthez
Stade Montois players
Racing 92 players